The flag of Moscow, in the Russian Federation, is a dark red banner of arms charged as the arms of the city in the centre.  It displays Saint George wearing armor and a blue cape with a golden lance in his right hand riding on a silver horse.  He is shown stabbing a zilant with the lance.  The legend in which the flag came from originated in Jacobus de Voragine's Golden Legend.

The flag was adopted on 1 February 1995. The proportions are 2:3.

References 
 Flags of the World

Flag of Moscow
Flag
Flag
Moscow
Flags introduced in 1995
Moscow
Saint George and the Dragon